The 2600 Class may refer to:
 CIÉ 2600 Class, Irish diesel railcars in service 1952-1987
 GWR 2600 Class, British steam locomotives in service 1900-1949
 IE 2600 Class, Irish diesel railcars in service since 1993
 Queensland_Railways_2600_class, Australian manufactured diesel-electric locomotives based on General Electric running gear in service since 1983-1984 and retired or exported by 2011-2012